Jeddah is a port city in Saudi Arabia.

Jeddah may also refer to:
 Jeddah (horse), a racehorse
 Jeddah Club, a Saudi Arabian football club
 , a passenger steamship

See also 
 Battle of Jeddah (disambiguation)
 Treaty of Jeddah (disambiguation)
 Jedda, an Australian film
 Jidda Island, Bahrain
 Jedha
 Jeddah Tower